Heron Ricardo Ferreira (born 28 January 1958), known as Heron, is a Brazilian professional football manager.

Since 1987 he coached many clubs, including Olaria, Juventude, Coritiba, Americano-RJ, Al-Hilal (Riyadh), Ituano, Anápolis, Náutico, Al-Hilal (Omdurman), Ismaily, Al-Ahli (Doha), Vila Nova, Al-Merrikh and ASA.

Managerial statistics

Titles
Juventude
 Campeonato Brasileiro Série B: 1
 	1994

References

External links
 
 Profile at Soccerpunter.com
 
 

1958 births
Living people
Sportspeople from Rio de Janeiro (city)
Brazilian football managers
Brazilian expatriate football managers
Expatriate football managers in Sudan
Brazilian expatriate sportspeople in Sudan
Expatriate football managers in Saudi Arabia
Brazilian expatriate sportspeople in Saudi Arabia
Expatriate football managers in Egypt
Brazilian expatriate sportspeople in Egypt
Campeonato Brasileiro Série A managers
Campeonato Brasileiro Série B managers
Olaria Atlético Clube managers
Esporte Clube Juventude managers
Americano Futebol Clube managers
Coritiba Foot Ball Club managers
Al Hilal SFC managers
Ituano FC managers
Clube Atlético Bragantino managers
União São João Esporte Clube managers
Anápolis Futebol Clube managers
Santa Cruz Futebol Clube managers
Figueirense FC managers
Clube de Regatas Brasil managers
Al-Hilal Club (Omdurman) managers
Ismaily SC managers
Al Ahli SC (Doha) managers
Vila Nova Futebol Clube managers
Al-Merrikh SC managers
Al-Ahly Shendi managers
Najran SC managers
Agremiação Sportiva Arapiraquense managers
Bonsucesso Futebol Clube managers
Saudi First Division League managers
Brazilian expatriate sportspeople in Qatar
Expatriate football managers in Qatar